Bastilla hamatilis is a moth of the family Noctuidae first described by Achille Guenée in 1852. It is found in the Australian state of Queensland.

References

External links

Bastilla (moth)
Moths described in 1852